Chełmiec may refer to:

Chełmiec, Lower Silesian Voivodeship (south-west Poland)
Chełmiec, Lublin Voivodeship (east Poland)
Chełmiec, Lesser Poland Voivodeship (south Poland)
Chełmiec, Warmian-Masurian Voivodeship (north Poland)
Chełmiec (mount) (south-west Poland)